Bathinda Airport  is an airport serving Malwa, a region in the Indian state of Punjab. The airport is a civil enclave of the Bhisiana air force station. Alliance Air introduced flights to Bathinda from Delhi in December 2016.

Infrastructure
It has a capacity for 100 passengers with a waiting area that can seat 30 people. The terminal contains two check-in counters and a VIP lounge.

The apron can park two aircraft similar to the ATR 72-600 in size.

Bhisiana air force station
Bathinda Airport functions as a civil enclave of the Bhisiana air force station. The Air Force provides air traffic control and emergency services for the airport.

Access
It has a car park with spaces for 40 vehicles. Direct bus service by the PRTC was scheduled to begin on the opening date of the passenger terminal; however, it was postponed following the death of the PRTC chairman.

Airlines and destinations

It was announced on 25 November 2016 that Alliance Air would begin flights between Bathinda and Delhi. The announcement came one week after talks between Air India and local officials regarding the viability of flights to Bathinda. The flights began operating three times a week with the ATR 72-600. A ceremony was held to inaugurate the terminal and the Delhi flights.

References

Indian Air Force bases
Transport in Bathinda
Airports in Punjab, India
Airports with year of establishment missing